Gbolahan Devin Aromashodu (born September 25, 1984) is a former American football wide receiver. He was drafted by the Miami Dolphins in the seventh round of the 2006 NFL Draft. He played college football at Auburn.

Aromashodu has also been a member of the Indianapolis Colts, Houston Texans, Washington Redskins, Minnesota Vikings and Chicago Bears.

Early years
Aromashodu was born and raised in Miami, Florida. His father, who immigrated to the United States from Nigeria, was deeply fond of football, but was reluctant to let his son play. Aromashodu eventually convinced his father to let him join a youth football team, where he surprised his father by becoming one of the team's best players. Aromashodu attended Miami Springs High School, where he was a three-sport star in football, basketball and track. In football, he played as a wide receiver, defensive back and kickoff returner. As a junior, he caught 29 passes for 620 yards and seven touchdowns and returned two kickoffs for touchdowns. As a senior, he caught 17 passes for 417 yards and four touchdowns and rushed for 372 yards and four scores on offense, while also totaled 45 tackles and one interception on defense. He frequently played against future teammate Devin Hester.

Also an standout track & field athlete, Aromashodu was one of the state's top sprinters. At the 2002 FHSAA State T&F Championships, he earned second-place finishes in both 100-meter dash (10.62 s) and 200-meter dash (22.28 s) events. In addition, he also ran a 4.4-second 40-yard dash, bench-pressed 250 lb, squatted 285 and had a 42-inch vertical jump.

College career
Aromashodu expressed interest in attending North Carolina State, Auburn University, and Florida. After much deliberation, he choose to play for Auburn.  Devin played a critical role in Auburn's offense during three of the four years he spent there, logging 71 catches for 1,333 yards and 9 touchdowns in 51 games with the Tigers.

Professional career

Miami Dolphins
After being drafted by the Miami Dolphins in the seventh round of the 2006 NFL Draft, Aromashodu failed to make the team's opening day roster.

Indianapolis Colts
After being cut from the Dolphins, Aromashodu would begin his early career as a practice squad member for a number of NFL teams.  A member of the Indianapolis Colts and Houston Texans's practice teams in 2007, Devin was signed to the active roster of the Colts on November 14, 2007. He would make appearances in six regular season games that season, amassing 96 yards on seven receptions.

Washington Redskins
Aromashodu was later waived by the Colts on August 7, 2008 and soon signed with the Washington Redskins practice squad.

Chicago Bears
After remaining on the inactive list during his first year with the Chicago Bears,  Jay Cutler lobbied to the team's offensive coordinator, Ron Turner, to give Aromashodu playing time.

He caught his first pass as a Bear on November 12, 2009 against the San Francisco 49ers. Aromashodu began to play a larger role in the team's offense after wide receiver Devin Hester was sidelined with a calf injury. He caught his first NFL career touchdown from Cutler on December 13, against the Green Bay Packers. Aromashodu played an integral part in the Bears Monday Night Football upset victory over the Minnesota Vikings, catching seven passes for 150 yards, including the game-winning touchdown in overtime.  During the 2009 season finale, Aromashodu caught two touchdowns and amassed 46 yards on five receptions in a 37–23 win over the Detroit Lions. He finished the season with 24 catches, 298 yards, and four receiving touchdowns.

His remarkable finish sparked criticism of the Bears' front office regarding why it took until Week 14 for Aromashodu to see significant playing time.  Former Bears offensive coordinator Ron Turner responded, "[Aromashodu] got hurt in the last preseason game. He hurt his hamstring, and he was out a couple weeks. When he came back, he wasn't back 100 percent. When he got back to the point that he was practicing at full speed and playing, we started to get him in the lineup. Could we have done it a couple weeks earlier? Possibly. But once he got healthy and started playing well in practice, we started getting him in the mix."

Minnesota Vikings
On July 26, 2011, Aromashodu and the Vikings came to agreement on a one-year contract. He caught 26 passes for 468 yards and 1 touchdown during the season, while starting 6 games. He became an unrestricted free agent Following the 2011 NFL season, but signed a 1-year to contract to remain with the Vikings on March 23, 2012. He caught 11 passes for 182 yards.

Chicago Bears (second stint)
On June 10, 2013, Aromashodu returned to the Bears. He caught three passes in the first three pre-season games. On August 25, 2013, Aromashadu was released in a wave of preseason roster cuts.

References

External links
 Auburn Tigers bio
 Chicago Bears bio

1984 births
Living people
American football wide receivers
American sportspeople of Nigerian descent
Auburn Tigers football players
Chicago Bears players
Houston Texans players
Indianapolis Colts players
Washington Redskins players
Miami Dolphins players
Miami Springs Senior High School alumni
Minnesota Vikings players
Players of American football from Fort Lauderdale, Florida